The 2020 Liga 2 season was the 75th edition of the second tier of Federación Peruana de Futbol. The season's play started on October 27, 2020 and ended on December 27, 2020.

Teams

Promotion and relegation (pre-season)
A total of 10 teams contested the league, including 7 sides from the 2019 season, two relegated from the 2019 Liga 1, and one promoted from the 2019 Copa Perú.

Teams promoted to Liga 1 
On 11 November 2019, Cienciano were the first team to be promoted to Liga 1, ending a four-year run in the Peruvian Segunda División/Liga 2, after defeating Santos by 4−2. The second team to earn promotion to Liga 1 was play-offs winner Atlético Grau, after a goal-less draw against Sport Chavelines on 11 December 2019. This marked the end to a two-year run in the second division.

Teams relegated from Liga 1 
The first team to be relegated from Liga 1 were Pirata. Their relegation was ensured on 1 November 2019, after Sport Boys beat Melgar 4−2, suffering an immediate relegation from the debut season in the first division. The second team to be relegated were Unión Comercio, who were relegated on 22 November 2019 after they were deducted 3 points for submitting fraudulent paperwork regarding the team doctor during a game against Universidad San Martín.

Teams relegated from Liga 2 
The first team to be relegated from Liga 2 were Sport Victoria, expelled on 9 August 2019, due to their failure to pay their players. This ended a seven-year spell in Segunda División. The second team to be relegated were Los Caimanes, who were relegated on 20 October 2019 after losing 3−1 against Juan Aurich, ending a five-year run in the second division. The third and final relegated club was Sport Loreto, after a walk-over win over Sport Victoria on 25 October 2019 ending a four-year spell in the second division.

Teams promoted to Liga 2 
The first and only team to achieve promotion was Sport Chavelines after a 1−1 draw against Sport Estrella during the 2019 Copa Perú's final group stage on 1 December 2019.

Stadia and locations

Because of the COVID-19 pandemic, the whole tournament was played in two stadiums:

Estadio Monumental "U", Estadio Alberto Gallardo, Estadio Miguel Grau were also used for matchday 9 during which all matches were played simultaneously.

Effects of the COVID-19 pandemic
The leaders of the clubs playing in Liga 2 originally proposed to begin playing the tournament on 2 May before the government announced a nation-wide lockdown on 15 March. The tournament was then indefinitely postponed. 

On 2 June, the Peruvian government through its Ministry of Health and the Instituto Peruano del Deporte (IPD) approved the biosecurity protocol presented by the Peruvian Football Federation to allow the resumption of the sports competitions, authorizing clubs to resume training sessions. On 2 September, the FPF and the Liga de Fútbol Profesional announced that the league would begin play on 26 October, with training sessions to resume on 28 September. It was also announced that the whole season would be played in Lima to avoid the constant travel between cities that clubs must do under normal circumstances. The FPF also awarded US$60,000 to each club as a pandemic-related financial relief.

League table

Results

Liguilla

Bracket

Semi-finals

Final

Top goalscorers

Liga 2 awards
The Liga 2 awards ceremony was held on 4 May 2021, 12:00 local time at the Villa Deportiva Nacional (VIDENA). The winners were chosen based on voting by coaches and captains of 2020 Liga 2 teams and local sports journalists.

See also
 2020 Liga 1

References

External links
  
Peruvian Segunda División news at Peru.com 
Peruvian Segunda División statistics and news at Dechalaca.com 
Peruvian Segunda División news at SegundaPerú.com 
 RSSSF

2020
2020 in Peruvian football